Hasanabad-e Navvab (also Romanized as Ḩasanābād-e Navvāb) is a village in Koshkuiyeh Rural District, Koshkuiyeh District, Rafsanjan County, Kerman Province, Iran. At the 2006 census, its population was 241, in 55 families.

References 

Populated places in Rafsanjan County